Carlo Pedersoli (31 October 1929 – 27 June 2016), known professionally as Bud Spencer, was an Italian actor, professional swimmer and water polo player. He was known for action-comedy and Spaghetti Western roles with his long-time film partner and friend Terence Hill. The duo "garnered world acclaim and attracted millions to theater seats". Spencer and Hill appeared in 18 films together.

In his youth, Bud Spencer was a successful athlete and swimmer for the Gruppo Sportivo Fiamme Oro. He obtained a law degree and registered several patents. Spencer also became a certified commercial airline and helicopter pilot, and supported and funded many children's charities, including the Spencer Scholarship Fund.

Early life
Son of Alessandro Pedersoli, Lombards descent, and Rosa Facchetti from Chiari, Lombardy, Carlo Pedersoli was born on 31 October 1929 in Santa Lucia, a historical rione in Naples and in the same building as the writer Luciano De Crescenzo. He played several sports and showed an aptitude for swimming, winning prizes. De Crescenzo was a classmate of his. In 1940, due to his father's work, he moved to Rome, where he attended high school and joined a swimming club. He finished school before his seventeenth birthday with the highest marks and enrolled at Sapienza University of Rome, where he studied chemistry. In 1947, the family moved to South America and Pedersoli discontinued his studies. From 1947 to 1949, he worked in the Italian consulate in Recife, Brazil, where he learned to speak fluent Portuguese.

Swimming and water polo career

Pedersoli returned to Italy in 1949 to play water polo in Rome for Società Sportiva Lazio Nuoto and won the Italian swimming championships in freestyle and mixed relay teams. As a professional swimmer in his youth, Spencer was the first Italian to swim the 100 m freestyle in less than one minute when on 19 September 1950 he swam the distance in 59.5 s in Salsomaggiore. In 1949 he made his international debut and a year later he was called up for the European championships in Vienna where he swam in two finals, finishing fifth in the 100 m and fourth in the relay 4 × 200 m.

In the 1951 Mediterranean Games in Alexandria (Egypt), he won a silver medal in the same 100 m freestyle event. Pedersoli participated in the 1952 Summer Olympics in Helsinki, Finland, reaching the semi-finals in the 100 m freestyle (58.8 s heats, 58.9 s semi final). Four years later, in Melbourne, he also entered the semi-finals in the same category (58.5 s heat, 59.0 s semi final).

As a water polo player, he won the Italian Championship in 1954 with S.S. Lazio and the gold medal at 1955 Mediterranean Games in Barcelona with the Italian national team. His swimming career ended abruptly in 1957.

On 17 January 2005, he was awarded the Caimano d'oro (Gold Caiman) by the Italian Swimming Federation. On 24 January 2007, he received swimming and water polo coach diplomas from the Italian Swimming Federation's president Paolo Barelli.

Acting career

Pedersoli's first film role was in Quel fantasma di mio marito, an Italian comedy short released in 1950. In 1951 he played a member of the Praetorian Guard in Quo Vadis, an epic film shot in Italy made by MGM and directed by Mervyn LeRoy. During the 1950s and early 1960s, Spencer appeared playing minor parts in Italian including Mario Monicelli's movie A Hero of Our Times, with Alberto Sordi and the 1954 war film Human Torpedoes with Raf Vallone.

In 1960, after the Summer Olympic games, Pedersoli married Maria Amato, daughter of Italian film producer Giuseppe Amato. He signed a contract with RCA Records to write lyrics for singers such as Ornella Vanoni and Nico Fidenco and soundtracks. In the following years, his son Giuseppe was born (1961), followed by Cristiana (1962), his contract with RCA expired and his father-in-law died (1964). Pedersoli became a producer of documentaries for the national public broadcasting company RAI.

Partnership with Terence Hill

In 1967, film director Giuseppe Colizzi offered him a role in God Forgives... I Don't!. On the set Pedersoli met Mario Girotti (Terence Hill). Although Pedersoli had met Girotti before on the set of Hannibal in 1959, this was the moment they went on to become a film duo. The film director asked the two actors to change their names, deeming them to be too Italian-sounding for a Western movie: Pedersoli chose Bud Spencer, with Bud inspired by Budweiser beer and Spencer by the actor Spencer Tracy.

While Hill's characters were agile and youthful, Spencer always played the "phlegmatic, grumpy strong-arm man with a blessed, naive child's laughter and a golden heart". Overall, Hill and Spencer worked together on 18 films, including (using their most common U.S. titles) the Spaghetti Westerns They Call Me Trinity (1970) and its sequel, Trinity Is Still My Name (1971). Their last teaming, Troublemakers (1994), was also in this genre.

Many of these have alternative titles, depending upon the country and distributor. Some have longer Italian versions that were edited for their release abroad. These films gathered popularity for both actors, especially throughout much of Europe and parts of Asia and South America. Because of the duo's huge popularity, many producers wanted to exploit their likeness with visually similar duos. Most notable were Paul L. Smith (adopted name Adam Eden in later years, sometimes credited Anam Eden) and Michael Coby (real name Antonio Cantafora) with at least 6 movies in Bud & Terence-fashion from 1973 to 1977, and István Bujtor with 6 movies in Piedone-fashion from 1981 to 2008.

In the Italian versions of his films, Spencer was generally dubbed by actor Glauco Onorato due to his thick Naples accent, although he was voiced by Sergio Fiorentini in Troublemakers, To the Limit (1997) and the Extralarge series (1991–93). For English dubs, Spencer was usually voiced by Robert Sommer, Edward Mannix or Richard McNamara, although he occasionally provided his own voice.

Spencer wrote the complete or partial screenplay for some of his movies. His feature film career slowed down after 1983, shifting more toward television. In the 1990s, he acted in the television action-drama Extralarge. His autobiography was published in 2011. In addition, Spencer also published a recipe book including his favorite dishes.

Political career
In 2005, he entered politics, unsuccessfully standing as regional councilor in Lazio for the Forza Italia party. Spencer stated: "In my life, I've done everything. There are only three things I haven't been – a ballet dancer, a jockey and a politician. Given that the first two jobs are out of the question, I'll throw myself into politics." The opposition criticized him for engaging in "politica spettacolo" ("showbiz politics").

Personal life

Spencer married Maria Amato in 1960, with whom he had three children: Giuseppe (1961), Cristiana (1962) and Diamante (1972). After appearing in Più forte, ragazzi!, Spencer became a jet airplane and helicopter pilot. He founded Mistral Air in 1984, an air-mail company that also transports pilgrims, but later sold it to Poste Italiane. Spencer's grandson, Carlo Pedersoli, Jr., is a mixed martial arts fighter currently signed the Ultimate Fighting Championship.

Death
Spencer died aged 86 on 27 June 2016 in Rome. Spencer's son Giuseppe Pedersoli stated that his father "died without pain in presence of his family, and his last word was 'grazie'". He was buried at the Campo Verano cemetery in Rome.

Legacy

Spencer posthumously received the America Award in 2018 from the Italy-USA Foundation.

In Hungary, where his films were hugely popular during the communist regime, a larger-than-life-sized bronze statue of Spencer created by sculptor Szandra Tasnádi was unveiled on 11 November 2017 in downtown Budapest, with Spencer's daughter Cristiana in attendance. The statue's pedestal bears the inscription "Mi sohasem veszekedtünk" ("We Never Fought"), a quote from Terence Hill's eulogy referring to their long-lasting friend- and partnership.

A beat 'em up video game titled Bud Spencer & Terence Hill: Slaps and Beans, closely based on Spencer and Hill's cinematic work, was developed by the Italian firm Trinity Team srls and first published by the German firm Buddy Productions GmbH in 2018.

In 2021, the Bud Spencer Museum opened in Berlin.

Filmography

Film

Television

Video games

References

External links

 
 Bud Spencer official website
 
 Hill & Spencer website  
 
 

1929 births
2016 deaths
20th-century Italian male actors
21st-century Italian male actors
Male actors from Naples
Italian people of Lombard descent
Italian male film actors
Male Spaghetti Western actors
Male Western (genre) film actors
Swimmers at the 1952 Summer Olympics
 
Italian male swimmers
Olympic swimmers of Italy
David di Donatello Career Award winners
Swimmers at the 1956 Summer Olympics
Italian male water polo players
Swimmers from Naples
Swimmers of Fiamme Oro
Mediterranean Games medalists in swimming
Mediterranean Games medalists in water polo
Mediterranean Games gold medalists for Italy
Mediterranean Games silver medalists for Italy
Swimmers at the 1951 Mediterranean Games
Water polo players at the 1955 Mediterranean Games
Burials at Campo Verano